Isla Cristina is a city and municipality located in the province of Huelva, Spain. According to the 2009 census, the city has a population of 21,324 inhabitants.

Isla Cristina remains one of the most important fishing ports in Andalusia, its catch being highly prized throughout Spain.

It is a popular summer holiday resort, particularly with the Spaniards themselves.  Sevillanos flock to the area in July and August, much of the attraction being the kilometers of 'Blue Flag' standard beaches.

Toponymy 

Isla Cristina was given its current name on April 12, 1834 in honor of Maria Christina of the Two Sicilies
and her service to the regions of Andalusia and Extremadura during the cholera epidemic of 1833–34. The city was originally called La Higuerita (English: The Little Fig Tree), also La Figarilla or La Figuerta (depending on the language) when it was founded in 1755. The name was christened as Real Isla de La Higuerita (English: Royal Island of the Little Fig Tree) in 1802.

Symbols 
The city's main symbols are the water well, the fig tree and the sea, which reflect the culture and history of the city.

Environment 
The marismas de Isla Cristina, next to the towns of Ayamonte and Isla Cristina, are a protected nature reserve.

See also 

 Port of Isla Cristina

References

External links 

Isla Cristina - Sistema de Información Multiterritorial de Andalucía
Isla Cristina - Traditional Isla Cristina

Municipalities in the Province of Huelva